Sundazed Music is an American independent record label based in Coxsackie, New York. It specializes in obscure and rare recordings from the 1950s to the 1970s. In 2000, Sundazed had a staff of 15 and two mixing studios, including a vintage audio equipment collection.

History
Label founders Bob Irwin and his wife Mary started the label in 1989. Irwin's skill at restoring old vinyl records for the (then new) CD format, attracted the attention of major labels, who increasingly solicited him to help them re-issue material from their back catalogs. He helped Sony Music release their archival Legacy Records label. Later, his restoration work included early material by the likes of Bob Dylan, Nancy Sinatra, and the Byrds.  Irwin also worked at Arista for a time.

The first Sundazed releases were 1960s recordings by the Knickerbockers and the Five Americans, and reflected Irwin's personal preference for garage rock and surf music. Later releases included the albums of the Turtles, the Challengers, Liverpool Five, and Jan and Dean's long-lost album Save for a Rainy Day. The company reissued the complete catalog of LPs by New Orleans funk pioneers the Meters on vinyl and CD. The label later ventured into country music, including extensive reissues of Capitol Records albums by Buck Owens and other acts including Jimmy Bryant. Sundazed also issued vintage jazz guitar albums through their Euphoria label.

Reissues
In 1995, Sundazed released a 20 track CD by The Pyramids,  Penetration! The Best of the Pyramids. Bob Irwin worked closely with John Hodge the manager and producer for the Pyramids. Hodge owned the masters for the original recordings which included the unissued music. Hodge also had a strong love of the music. Irwin was also planning a second release of their work. It was to be a "Lost Pyramids" album of unreleased material. He also did the same for The Revels, the Impact Records recording artists who had a hit with "Church Key. Working with The Revels' original music director Tony Hilder and band members, Sam Eddy and Norman Knowles, he had their work which was recorded years before re-released.

They also reissued Oar by Skip Spence in 1999.

Sundazed also reissued the Columbia Moby Grape albums, but were immediately forced to withdraw the first three albums due to legal disputes involving the band's ex-manager Matthew Katz.  In 2009, they signed Morly Grey to reissue The Only Truth   which came out on Sundazed SC 11216.  Also that year, they released the long-lost Columbia sessions by the group Love.

On June 24, 2018, it was reported that Sundazed Records would be reissuing Mike Nesmith's recordings with First National Band, originally released after his band The Monkees' television series was canceled in 1969. The band’s three albums, Magnetic South, Loose Salute, and Nevada Fighter, were originally recorded and released between 1970 and 1971. It featured Nesmith on guitar and vocals, with John Ware on drums, John London on bass, and O.J. "Red" Rhodes on pedal steel guitar.

New releases
In 2015, after a conversation with former Kentucky Headhunters guitarist Greg Martin about Groovy Grubworm, an old instrumental record of which both were fond, Bob Irwin decided to create subsidiary label Sundazed RFD, a label exclusively for instrumental 45 RPM recordings. "Groovy Grubworm" by Harlow Wilcox And The Oakies, "Shark Country" by the SloBeats (a band composed of Kenny Vaughan, Dave Roe and Maxwell Schauf) and "The Lonely Bull" by The East Nashville Teens were among the first records to be released by the new label.

See also
 List of record labels

References

External links
 Official website

American independent record labels
Record labels established in 1989
Reissue record labels